The Third cabinet of Davíð Oddsson in Iceland was formed 28 May 1999.

Cabinets

Inaugural cabinet: 28 May 1999 – 31 December 1999

First reshuffle: 31 December 1999 – 14 April 2001
Valgerður Sverrisdóttir replaced Finnur Ingólfsson as Minister of Commerce and Minister of Industry.

Second reshuffle: 14 April 2001 – 2 March 2002
Jón Halldór Kristjánsson replaced Ingibjörg Pálmadóttir as Minister of Health and Social Security.

Third reshuffle: 2 March 2002 – 23 May 2003
Tómas Ingi Olrich replaced Björn Bjarnason as Minister of Education, Science and Culture.

See also
Government of Iceland
Cabinet of Iceland

References

David Oddsson, Third cabinet of
David Oddsson, Third cabinet of
David Oddsson, Third cabinet of
Cabinets established in 1999
Cabinets disestablished in 2003
Independence Party (Iceland)
Progressive Party (Iceland)